Nicky Cocquyt (born ) is a Belgian male  track cyclist, riding for the national team. He competed in the scratch event at the 2011 UCI Track Cycling World Championships.

References

External links
 Profile at cyclingarchives.com

1984 births
Living people
Belgian track cyclists
Belgian male cyclists
Place of birth missing (living people)